The Kalapuya are a Native American people, which had eight independent groups speaking three mutually intelligible dialects. The Kalapuya tribes' traditional homelands were the Willamette Valley of present-day western Oregon in the United States, an area bounded by the Cascade Range to the east, the Oregon Coast Range at the west, the Columbia River at the north, to the Calapooya Mountains of the Umpqua River at the south.

Today, most Kalapuya people are enrolled in the federally recognized Confederated Tribes of the Grand Ronde Community of Oregon; in addition, some are members of the Confederated Tribes of the Siletz. In both cases descendants have often intermarried with people of other tribes in the confederated tribes, and are counted in overall tribal numbers, rather than separately. Most of the Kalapuya descendants live at the Grand Ronde reservation, located in Yamhill and Polk counties.

Name
The tribal name has been rendered into English under various spellings as "Calapooia," "Calapuya," "Calapooya," "Kalapooia," and "Kalapooya."

Language
The Kalapuyan people spoke dialects of the Kalapuyan language. It was categorized by John Wesley Powell as part of the Takelman language group. In the early 21st century, these are known as the Oregon Penutian languages.

The Kalapuyan people were not a single homogeneous tribal entity but rather were made up of eight autonomous subdivisions, loosely related to one another by three language dialects, which were mutually intelligible. The eight related groups comprising the Kalapuya people spoke three distinct dialects of the Oregon Penutian language family: Northern Kalapuyan, Central Kalapuyan, and Yoncalla (also called Southern Kalapuya).

Catholic missionary François Blanchet said that "fourteen or fifteen different dialects were spoken by these tribes; they are not so essentially different but that they can understand each other. Moreover, the Chinook jargon is spoken among the Kalapooias [sic]." Chinook jargon was a trade language that developed among the Native Americans for their own use and for trading with Europeans. It became popular on the Grand Ronde Reservation. The Confederated Tribes of the Grand Ronde Community have renamed it as Chinuk Wawa, and developed a language immersion program for children to create new generations of native speakers.

Social structure
Kalapuya bands typically consisted of extended families of related men, their wives, and children. They had a patrilineal kinship system. These bands would occupy a year-round village: during the winter they lived there full-time. During the spring and summer, some members split off into smaller groups and traveled to other areas to gather seasonal food and raw materials for basketry. Bands frequently had a single leader or chief— generally the wealthiest man — who would resolve arguments, settle collective debts of the community such as those incurred through gambling, and would provide food for feasts.

As was the case for many tribes of the Pacific Northwest, the Kalapuya practiced slavery. They generally obtained Indian slaves through trade or as gifts. The slaves were usually captured by enemy peoples during raids. Northern Kalapuya groups, such as the Tualatin and Yamhill, obtained slaves through conquest, raiding bands located on the coast or further south in the Willamette Valley. Slaves were considered a form of wealth; they were traded to obtain desired commodities, including beads, blankets, and canoes. Women and children were preferred as slaves, owing to their comparative ease of control.

Slaves lived with the families who owned them, working side-by-side in gender-specific daily tasks and performing chores such as the collection of firewood and water. Slaves were often free to marry. They could purchase freedom through their own accumulation of property or through sufficient payment to the owner by a prospective spouse.

The patriarchal Kalapuyan society had divisions by wealth and personal property. Special religious leaders were also recognized as a distinct class. These people were believed to possess supernatural predictive or healing powers and could have their origin in any group; they might be male or female, free individual or slave.

Kalapuyan society had gender-differentiated labor, as did many Native American tribes. Men engaged in fishing, hunting, and warfare. They also made tools and constructed canoes. Women worked to gather and prepare the staple plant foods that were the basis of the Kalapuyan diet, set up temporary camps, and constructed baskets and other craft products. During the summer months the women of the band would process and prepare food products for winter storage, generally staying in the main village to complete the task, while others gathered the foods from afar.

Historic Kalapuyan groups 

The Kalapuyan groups (identified by language) were:

-Northern Kalapuya:
Tualatin, also known as the Atfalati, along the Tualatin River 
Yamhill, along the Yamhill River

-Central Kalapuya:
Ahantchuyuk, along the Pudding River 
Luckiamute, along the Luckiamute River 
Santiam, along the lower Santiam River near present-day Lebanon 
Chepenefa, along the Marys River near present-day Corvallis 
Chemapho, along Muddy Creek (Central Kalapuya)
Tsankupi, along the Calapooia River 
Mohawk, along the Mohawk River (Note: These have no relation to the Iroquoian-speaking Mohawk Nation of New York and Canada)
Chafan
Chelamela, along the Long Tom River 
Winefelly, along the Mohawk, McKenzie, and Coast Fork Willamette rivers.

-Yoncalla: 
Yoncalla, along the Umpqua River.

In his description of the Indians of the Willamette Valley in 1849, Governor Joseph Lane gave the following estimates for the tribes' populations:
"Calipoa": 60; "Tualatine": 60; "Yam Hill": 90; "Lucka-mues": 15.

History
The Kalapuya people are believed to have entered their historical homeland in the Willamette Valley by migrating from the south of the valley northwards and forcing out earlier inhabitants.

Each of these bands occupied specific areas along the Willamette, Umpqua, and McKenzie rivers. The various Kalapuyan bands were hunter-gatherers, gaining food by fishing and hunting by the men, and gathering of nuts, berries and other fruits and roots by the women. The tribe made use of obsidian obtained from the volcanic ranges to the east to fashion sharp and effective projectile points, including arrowheads and spear tips.

Prior to contact with white explorers, traders, and missionaries, the Kalapuya population is believed to have numbered as many as 15,000 people. Robert Boyd estimates the total Kalapuyan population between 8,780 and 9,200 for the period between 1805 and the end of the decade of the 1820s.

Catastrophic epidemics of infectious diseases such as malaria, smallpox, and other endemic diseases occurred after Natives contracted diseases from the white explorers, traders, and missionaries who entered the region. These diseases were endemic among the Europeans and Americans, but the Native Americans didn't have immunity to them and died at a high rate as a result. Some accounts tell of villages devoid of inhabitants, standing in grim testament to the high mortality of these epidemics. Blanchet reported in 1839 that diseases "reduced [them] to a very small population threatening to decline more and more."

By 1849 Oregon territorial governor Joseph Lane reckoned the remaining Kalapuyan population at just 60 souls — with those survivors living in the most dire of conditions. Contemporary scholarship estimates the total of the various Kalapuya peoples in this interval at closer to 600.

Treaties with the United States 
The United States conducted two major cycles of treatymaking in Oregon that affected the Kalapuya: in 1851 and in 1854 to 1855. The 1851 treaties were negotiated by Oregon's Superintendent of Indian Affairs Anson Dart, and those in 1855 by Dart's successor Joel Palmer. While the 1851 treaties were never ratified by the Senate and thus were not implemented, the 1854–1855 ones were.

On April 12, 1851, at the Santiam Treaty Council in Champoeg, Oregon Territory, Santiam Kalapuya tribal leaders voiced strong opinions over where they would live. The Santiam leaders Alquema and Tiacan wanted to maintain their traditional territory between the forks of the Santiam River.

In the 1854 Treaty of Calapooia Creek, Oregon, Umpqua and Kalapuyan tribes of Umpqua Valley ceded their lands to the United States.

In the Treaty with the Kalapuya, etc., at Dayton, Oregon (January 22, 1855), the Kalapuya and other tribes of the Willamette valley ceded the entire drainage area of the Willamette River to the United States.

Reservation era 

Most Kalapuya Indians were removed to the Grand Ronde Agency and reservation. Some were assigned to the Siletz Reservation (known then as the Coast Indian Reservation) on the central Pacific Coast of Oregon, Warm Springs Reservation east of the Cascade Mountains in what are now Wasco and Jefferson Counties, or Yakama Reservation in Southern Washington State. Settled in 1855 as a temporary reserve, the Grand Ronde Reservation was first called the Yamhill River Reserve or Yamhill Valley reserve. It was officially renamed and established as the Grand Ronde Reservation by Executive Order in 1857.

With members of at least 27 tribes removed to Grand Ronde, life at the reservation was difficult. Some of these tribes had historically been enemies. In the early years, the reservation was managed by the US Department of War. As it had earlier waged war against the tribes, it supervised Indian affairs across the country. Fort Yamhill was established to oversee the Indians. Later Indian management was taken over by the Commissioner of Indian Affairs and finally the Bureau of Indian Affairs, placed within the Department of Interior.

Rev. Adrien Croquet (Crocket) of Belgium was the Roman Catholic missionary at Grand Ronde and established St. Michael's church. The Roman Catholic Church also established a school there in the late 19th century with approval by the United States. The school was an on-reservation boarding school to which children from other sites were at times forcibly removed and made to stay at school throughout the school year. Many children were later sent to off-reservation Indian boarding schools, such as Chemawa Indian School in Salem. Most children were taught rural skills such as blacksmithing, farming, sewing, etc. believed to be important to their future lives on the reservation.

Sanitation and health care at the reservation was poor, and mortality was high. In the 1850s a total of 1,000 people had been moved there. By 1900, only about 300 people survived.

Termination and restoration 

In the mid-20th century, Federal policy continued to be directed at assimilation of Native Americans. Congress believed that some tribes were ready to enter the mainstream society and end their special relationship with the government. All of the bands and tribes of the Kalapuya descendants were terminated in 1954, along with all other western Oregon tribes, in the Western Oregon Indian Termination Act of 1954. This ended their special relationship with the federal government. Under final termination actions, the government sold most of the reservation lands, removed its services, and published final rolls of the tribe in the Congressional Record in 1956.

In the late 20th century, the Kalapuya and other peoples in the confederated tribes reorganized to assert their Native American culture. The United States restored federal recognition in 1977 to the Confederated Tribes of the Siletz and in 1983 to those who were part of the Confederated Tribes of the Grand Ronde Community of Oregon.

The Kalapuya have intermarried extensively with descendants of their neighboring tribes. Most of the estimated 4,000 Kalapuya descendants today are enrolled in Confederated Tribes of the Grand Ronde Community of Oregon. This community is working to revive a common creole Native American language, long used for trade among various tribes and now known as Chinuk Wawa, by developing an immersion program for their children. They have had success in producing native speakers and are expanding the program through the eighth grade.

See also
 Kalapuyan languages
 Gender Roles

References

Further reading

 Robert T. Boyd, "Another Look at the 'Fever and Ague' of Western Oregon," Ethnohistory, vol. 22, no. 2 (Spring 1975), pp. 135–154. In JSTOR.
 Robert T. Boyd, The Coming of the Spirit of Pestilence: Introduced Infectious Diseases and Population Decline among Northwest Coast Indians. Seattle, WA: University of Washington Press, 1999.
 C.F. Coan, "The Adoption of the Reservation Policy in Pacific Northwest, 1853–1855," Quarterly of the Oregon Historical Society, vol. 23, no. 1 (March 1922), pp. 1–38. In JSTOR.
 Leo J. Frachtenberg, "Myths of the Alsea Indians of Northwestern Oregon," International Journal of American Linguistics, vol. 1, no. 1 (July 1917), pp. 64–75. In JSTOR.
 Melinda Marie Jetté, "'Beaver Are Numerous, but the Natives ... Will Not Hunt Them': Native-Fur Trader Relations in the Willamette Valley, 1812–1814," Pacific Northwest Quarterly, vol. 98, no. 1 (Winter 2006/2007), pp. 3–17. In JSTOR.
 Tracy Neal Leavelle, "'We Will Make It Our Own Place': Agriculture and Adaptation at the Grand Ronde Reservation, 1856–1887," American Indian Quarterly, vol. 22, no. 4 (Autumn 1998), pp. 433–456. In JSTOR.
 David Gene Lewis, Termination of the Confederated Tribes of the Grand Ronde Community of Oregon: Politics, Community, Identity. PhD dissertation. University of Oregon, 2009.
 Harold Mackey, The Kalapuyans: A Sourcebook on the Indians of the Willamette Valley. Salem, OR: Mission Mill Museum Association, 1974.
 Ronald Spores, "Too Small a Place: The Removal of the Willamette Valley Indians, 1850–1856," American Indian Quarterly, vol. 17, no. 2 (Spring 1993), pp. 171–191. In JSTOR.

External links

 Confederated Tribes of Grand Ronde
 Confederated Tribes of Siletz Indians
 The Kalapuyans, University of Oregon
 Article in the Oregon Encyclopedia, about preservation of the language and traditions of the Tualatin Kalapuyans

 
Confederated Tribes of Siletz Indians
Native American tribes in Oregon
Willamette Valley
Indigenous peoples of the Northwest Plateau